Clavulina sprucei is a species of coral fungus in the family Clavulinaceae. It is known from Guyana and Brazil.

References

sprucei
Fungi described in 1856
Fungi of Guyana
Fungi of Brazil
Taxa named by Miles Joseph Berkeley